Viceroy Sarah is a 1935 historical play by the British writer Norman Ginsbury. It is based on the relationship between Sarah, Duchess of Marlborough and Queen Anne during the time of the War of the Spanish Succession.

Its West End run lasted for a 157 performances,  premiering at the Whitehall Theatre before transferring to the Phoenix Theatre. Irene Vanbrugh starred as Sarah Churchill, alongside Barbara Everest as Anne and Robert Rendel as the Duke of Marlborough. The cast also included Harcourt Williams as George, Prince of Denmark, Olga Lindo as Abigail Hill and Ian Fleming as Robert Harley.

References

Bibliography
 Wearing, J.P. The London Stage 1930-1939: A Calendar of Productions, Performers, and Personnel.  Rowman & Littlefield, 2014.

1935 plays
British plays
Plays set in the 18th century
Plays set in London
Cultural depictions of Anne, Queen of Great Britain
Cultural depictions of Sarah Churchill, Duchess of Marlborough
Cultural depictions of John Churchill, Duke of Marlborough
West End plays
Plays about British royalty